The 2023 Princess Auto Players' Championship will be held from April 11 to 16 at the Mattamy Athletic Centre in Toronto, Ontario. It will be the fifth Grand Slam event and final major of the 2022–23 curling season.

Qualification
The top 12 ranked men's and women's teams on the World Curling Federation's Year-to-Date rankings as of March 13, 2023 qualified for the event. In the event that a team declines their invitation, the next-ranked team on the world team ranking is invited until the field is complete.

Men
Top Year-to-Date men's teams:
 Niklas Edin
 Matt Dunstone
 Joël Retornaz
 Brad Gushue
 Brendan Bottcher
 Yannick Schwaller
 Bruce Mouat
 Kevin Koe
 Korey Dropkin
 Ross Whyte
 Reid Carruthers
 Magnus Ramsfjell

Women
Top Year-to-Date women's teams:
 Kerri Einarson
 Silvana Tirinzoni
 Tracy Fleury
 Gim Eun-ji
 Jennifer Jones
 Satsuki Fujisawa
 Kaitlyn Lawes
 Clancy Grandy
 Anna Hasselborg
 Isabella Wranå
 Casey Scheidegger
 Meghan Walter
 Tabitha Peterson

Men

Teams
The teams are listed as follows:

Women

Teams
The teams are listed as follows:

References

External links

April 2023 sports events in Canada
2023 in Canadian curling
Curling in Toronto
Sports competitions in Toronto
2023 in Toronto
Players' Championship